USS Carroll (DE-171) was a  in service with the United States Navy from 1943 to 1946. She was sold for scrap in 1966.

History
USS Carroll was launched on 21 June 1943 at the Federal Shipbuilding and Drydock Company, Newark, New Jersey, sponsored by Mrs. H. F. Carroll, Sr. (mother of LT Herbert F. Carroll, USN, ship's namesake); She was then towed to the Norfolk Navy Yard for completion and commissioned on 24 October 1943 and reported to the Atlantic Fleet.

World War II North Atlantic operations 
 
Carroll was assigned to convoy escort duty, with its heavy demands for vigilance, ability to steam in all weather, and optimum readiness for duty at all times. Between 1 January 1944 and 9 May 1945, she made eight voyages between Norfolk, Virginia, and Gibraltar, Casablanca, Bizerte, and Algeria, guarding the men and supplies destined to carry the war through southern Europe. Between convoys, Carroll received necessary attention at east coast shipyards, and sharpened her training with exercises in Casco Bay.

World War II Pacific Theatre operations 
 
With the coming to the European theater of the victory in which she had played a significant part, Carroll was reassigned to the Pacific Fleet, to which she reported at Cristobal, Canal Zone, on 9 June 1945. She sailed to San Diego, California, and Pearl Harbor for exercises through 15 July, when she sailed for Eniwetok, Saipan, and Ulithi, arriving on 17 August.
 
Until 3 November 1945, Carroll patrolled the smaller islands of the Palau group searching for by-passed Japanese garrisons and prisoners of war. On 6 October, the surrender of Sonsorol, Fanna, Merir, and Tobi Islands was signed on her decks. She then furnished supplies, and supervised the evacuation of the islands by the Japanese.

Post-War decommissioning 

She was homeward bound on 3 November, and arrived at Jacksonville, Florida, on 14 December. Here she was decommissioned and placed in reserve on 19 June 1946. She was struck from the Navy List on 1 August 1965, sold on 29 December 1966 and scrapped.

References

External links 

 

Cannon-class destroyer escorts of the United States Navy
1943 ships
World War II frigates and destroyer escorts of the United States
Ships built in Portsmouth, Virginia